Air Vice Marshal Sir John Gerard Willsley Weston,  (15 November 1908 – 13 June 1979) was a high-ranking signals officer in the Royal Air Force during the Second World War and the post-war years. He later served as the Deputy Head of the Secret Intelligence Service (MI6). There is a Weston Avenue in Leighton Buzzard that used to be housing for personnel at RAF Stanbridge. Since this was a signals establishment during the Second World War, it is believed that it is named after him.

References
 Air of Authority – A History of RAF Organisation – Air Vice Marshal Sir John Weston

1908 births
1979 deaths
Companions of the Order of the Bath
Knights Commander of the Order of the British Empire
Royal Air Force air marshals
Royal Air Force personnel of World War II